John Rollins (born June 25, 1975) is an American professional golfer.

Early life
Rollins was born in Richmond, Virginia, where he attended Meadowbrook High School. He attended Virginia Commonwealth University, graduating in 1997.

Professional career
Rollins turned professional in 1997. He has won three times on the PGA Tour, in 2002, 2006 and 2009, and once on the Buy.com Tour (now Web.com Tour) in 2001.

Rollins has also featured in the top 50 of the Official World Golf Ranking, peaking at 41st in 2007.

Professional wins (4)

PGA Tour wins (3)

PGA Tour playoff record (1–2)

Buy.com Tour wins (1)

Buy.com Tour playoff record (1–0)

Results in major championships

CUT = missed the half-way cut
"T" = tied

Summary

Most consecutive cuts made – 3 (twice)
Longest streak of top-10s – 0

Results in The Players Championship

CUT = missed the halfway cut
"T" indicates a tie for a place

Results in World Golf Championships

QF, R16, R32, R64 = Round in which player lost in match play
"T" = Tied
Note that the HSBC Champions did not become a WGC event until 2009.

See also
1999 PGA Tour Qualifying School graduates
2001 Buy.com Tour graduates

References

External links

American male golfers
PGA Tour golfers
Korn Ferry Tour graduates
Golfers from Virginia
Golfers from Texas
Virginia Commonwealth University alumni
Sportspeople from Richmond, Virginia
People from Colleyville, Texas
1975 births
Living people